The Piasecki 16H was a series of compound helicopters produced in the 1960s. The first version of the Pathfinder, the -1 version, first flew in 1962. The similar but larger Pathfinder II, the 16H-1A, was completed in 1965.

Variants
Model 16H-1 Pathfinder  one PWC PT6B-2 with one 405 shp turboshaft engine
Model 16H-1A Pathfinder II  larger version with one  T58-GE-8
Model 16H-1C Pathfinder III  proposed conversion of the 16H-1A with one  T58-GE-5 
Model 16H-3J  nine-seat development, not built.

Specifications (16H-1A)

See also

References
Notes

Bibliography

Robb, Raymond L. "Hybrid helicopters: Compounding the quest for speed", Vertiflite. Summer 2006. American Helicopter Society.

External links
 Model 16H-1 Pathfinder
 Model 16H-1A Pathfinder II
 Model 16H-3

16H
1960s United States experimental aircraft
Ducted fan-powered aircraft
Compound helicopters
1960s United States helicopters
Single-turbine helicopters
Aircraft first flown in 1962